San Miguel Arcángel Fountain is an 18th-century fountain installed in Puebla's Zócalo, in the Mexican state of Puebla.

See also
 San Miguel Arcángel Fountain (Cholula)

References

External links

 

Fountains in Mexico
Michael (archangel)
Outdoor sculptures in Puebla (city)
Statues in Puebla
Historic centre of Puebla
Baroque architecture in Puebla